Super Star is the fourth studio album by Taiwanese girl group S.H.E. It was released on 22 August 2003. Ella suffered a back injury during the shooting of a television show one month before the album was released. Because of this, Ella is absent from some of the music videos. As of 2006, the single "Super Star" from this album has been S.H.E's biggest hit. German producer Roberto "Geo" Rosan and vocalist Jade Villalon, as Sweetbox, composed "Super Star" for S.H.E during the sessions for Sweetbox's Adagio, and they also released their own English version as a single at the time. In 2004, Canadian singer Skye Sweetnam re-recorded "Super Star" as "Superstar".

Reception
Super Star continued Youth Society'''s success by landing six songs on the HITORadio Top 10 charts. Furthermore, Super Star earned S.H.E their second consecutive Best Group and Best Chart Performance awards at the 2004 HITO Awards. The album's title track itself was also well received. "Super Star" was crowned Metro Radio's 2004 Song of the Year, and recognized as one of the year's best songs at the HITO Radio Music Awards, Singapore Hit Awards, and Hong Kong TVB8 Awards. The four awards earned by "Super Star" were the most for any S.H.E song until "Don't Wanna Grow Up" (Once Upon a Time) earned six between 2006 and 2007.

Track listing

Music videos
Both "Far Away" and "River Shore Park" are based on themes of lost love. "Super Star", while dominated by a rock concert concept, contains a loose love plot where the girl is rejected, only to receive a kiss later in the video. "Heavy Rain" is a story of companion love between two parents, played by Selina and Hebe. "I.O.I.O" is a story of two girls, Selina and Hebe, fighting over a boy (Ella) who actually doesn't like either girl in the first place. The video was the first to feature S.H.E super deformed; more concrete versions were featured in S.H.E's next album, Magical Journey''.

References

2003 albums
S.H.E albums
HIM International Music albums